Ray Lewis (born 1975) is a former professional American football player.

Ray Lewis may also refer to:

 Ray Lewis (referee) (born 1944), former English association football referee
 Ray Lewis (sprinter) (1910–2003), Canadian sprinter and the first Canadian-born black Olympic medalist
 Ray Lewis (youth worker) (born 1963), former deputy mayor of London
 Ray Lewis, American rhythm and blues singer and member of The Drifters

See also
 Raymond Lewis (1952–2001), American basketball and streetball player